Moyer Creek starts at Wheelock Pond near Jerusalem Hill, New York. Past Gulph, New York Moyer Creek follows a deep ravine, the Frankfort Gorge, south towards Frankfort, New York before converging with the Mohawk River in Frankfort, New York. The headwaters of Moyer Creek rise within a half mile of the source of the Unadilla River which is the most northerly headwater source of the Susquehanna and the closest to the Mohawk River.

References 

Rivers of New York (state)
Rivers of Herkimer County, New York
Mohawk River